Márcio Fábio Martins (born 30 April 1980) is a Brazilian football player who is now playing in TSW Pegasus. He plays as a centre-back and defensive midfielder. He joined the team on 10 September 2009.

Career
Under manager Luiz Carlos Ferreira, Márcio Martins made his debut in Campeonato Brasileiro Serie A with Figueirense during December 2003.

Career Statistics in Hong Kong
As of 11 September 2009

References

External links
Profile at Foradejogo
 Player Information on tswpegasus.com
 MELHORES MOMENTOS - MARCIO MARTINS

1980 births
Living people
Brazilian footballers
Brazilian expatriate footballers
Association football midfielders
Guaratinguetá Futebol players
Figueirense FC players
Guarani FC players
Grêmio Esportivo Juventus players
Vitória S.C. players
Ceará Sporting Club players
Goytacaz Futebol Clube players
TSW Pegasus FC players
Hong Kong First Division League players
Expatriate footballers in Hong Kong
Brazilian expatriate sportspeople in Hong Kong

Association football defenders
People from Ibitinga